Canadian jazz refers to the jazz and jazz-related music performed by jazz bands and performers in Canada. There are hundreds of local and regionally based Canadian jazz bands and performers. A number of Canadian jazz artists have achieved international prominence, including Oscar Peterson, Maynard Ferguson, and Gil Evans.

History

Early history
The first jazz concert in Canada was by the touring Creole Orchestra and Ragtime Band, led by Bill Johnson and featuring cornetist Freddie Keppard at the Pantages Playhouse Theatre in Winnipeg, Manitoba on September 21, 1914.  This performance was the first jazz performance outside the United States and the beginning of jazz as an international movement.

Since then, given its proximity to the United States, Canada quickly became the first country beyond the USA to have its own jazz scene, with artists popping up in cities across the country, notably in Montreal, Quebec in the 1910s. In part this was due to U.S. black jazz musicians finding escape in Canada from the racism rampant in the U.S.

Canadian groups soon sprung up, among them the Clar-Ra Ladies Jazz Orchestra. The Jazz Baby Vaudeville (AKA the Original Winnipeg Jazz Babies) was composed of Winnipeg teens, each playing two or more instruments. These bands performed in dance clubs across the Prairies in 1920s.  In 1926 pianist Shirley Oliver, with a background playing "hot-dance" tunes, opened a jazz music studio in Edmonton. In Vancouver George Paris organized a jazz band for the Patricia Hotel in 1917. He is regarded by some as Canada's first true jazz musician. Others give that status to pianist Harry Thomas who recorded improvisational-accented ragtime music in 1916.

1950s and 60s
By the 1950s, jazz was popular across Canada, and a number of Canadian jazz artists became well known beyond their home country, most notably pianist Oscar Peterson, known as a virtuoso pianist and recording artist. During this decade, Canadian Gil Evans was noted for his collaborations with Miles Davis as well as his own recordings, many of which are important early examples of a fusion of jazz and classical music known as third stream.

1970s to present
Montreal's Maynard Ferguson, known for his high register on the trumpet, recorded a number of popular albums in the 1970s. Innovative Canadian guitarists, Lenny Breau and Ed Bickert, are among the most highly-regarded jazz guitarists of all time. Breau was known for finger picking style, his use of seven-string guitar, and his ability to play bass, chords and melody simultaneously. Bickert was known for popularizing the use of solid-body guitars, rare among jazz artists at that time, which produced a distinct and signature tone. 

In the 21st century, a number of Canadian jazz vocalists, such as Diana Krall and Michael Buble became popular.

Nationally or internationally prominent artists
As of 2021, three Canadians artists have been inducted into the DownBeat Jazz Hall of Fame: Oscar Peterson, Maynard Ferguson, and Gil Evans. In addition to these three, six other jazz artists have been inducted into the Canadian Music Hall of Fame: Oliver Jones, Lenny Breau, Moe Koffman, Guy Lombardo, Rob McConnell, and Kenny Wheeler. Other important Canadian jazz musicians include singers Michael Bublé, Diana Krall, Carol Welsman and Eleanor Collins, called “The Canadian First Lady of Jazz”, as well as bandleaders Fraser MacPherson and Mynie Sutton, renowned free jazz pianist Paul Bley, pianist Renee Rosnes, and guitar legend Ed Bickert.

Jazz festivals in Canada

Many Canadian cities host one or more jazz festivals. The Montreal International Jazz Festival, for instance, is the largest in the world.

References

External links